Ancient Artifacts is D.I.'s first full-length studio album, which was released in 1985. "Hang Ten in East Berlin" and "Spiritual Law" were later re-recorded on the band's second album, Horse Bites Dog Cries, which was released in 1986. "O.C. Life" was later covered by Zebrahead, which was a bonus track for the Orange County OST and The Offspring as a bonus track for their Rise and Fall, Rage and Grace album. O.C. Life was originally written by Rikk Agnew of the Adolescents  and appeared on his solo album All By Myself in 1982.

Track listings

Original LP release
 "O.C. Life" – 2:53
 "Purgatory II" – 2:23
 "Stand Up" – 2:11
 "Eringzo" – 2:05
 "(I Hate) Surfin' in H.B." – 1:54
 "Falling Out" – 3:10
 "Hang Ten in East Berlin" - 1:56
 "Wounds from Within" - 3:57
 "Spiritual Law" – 3:05

CD re-release
"O.C. Life" – 2:53
"Purgatory II" – 2:23
"Stand Up" – 2:11
"Eringzo" – 2:05
"(I Hate) Surfin' in H.B." – 1:54
"Falling Out" – 3:10
"Hang Ten in East Berlin" - 1:56
"Wounds from Within" - 3:57
"Spiritual Law" – 3:05
"Imminent War (Live)" - 2:22
"Pervert Nurse (Live)" - 3:49
"Guns (Live)" - 2:43
"Reagans der Fuhrer (Live)" - 2:21
"Little Land (Live)" - 2:56
"Kids of the Black Hole (Live)" - 5:03

Notes
The live version of "Guns" is actually a mislabeled live version of "Stick To Your Guns". The song is even announced as the latter by vocalist Casey Royer before they proceed to play "Stick To Your Guns".

Personnel
 Casey Royer - lead vocals
 Rikk Agnew - guitars, vocals
 Alfie Agnew - guitars, vocals
 John Bosco - bass, vocals
 John Knight - drums

References

D.I. (band) albums
1985 debut albums